The Klesilkwa River is a tributary of the Skagit River, flowing east to join that river to the west of Shawatum Mountain after arising near Klesilkwa Mountain, on the east flank of Chilliwack Lake.

References

Canadian Cascades
Rivers of the Lower Mainland